Shin Sang-kyu (born 2 May 1968) is a South Korean wrestler. He competed in the men's freestyle 62 kg at the 1992 Summer Olympics.

References

1968 births
Living people
South Korean male sport wrestlers
Olympic wrestlers of North Korea
Wrestlers at the 1992 Summer Olympics
Place of birth missing (living people)
Asian Games medalists in wrestling
Wrestlers at the 1990 Asian Games
Asian Games bronze medalists for South Korea
Medalists at the 1990 Asian Games
20th-century South Korean people